Clintmains is a village by the River Tweed, in the parish of Mertoun, to the east of Newtown St Boswells, in the Scottish Borders area of Scotland, in the former county of Berwickshire.

Places nearby include Bemersyde House, Dryburgh Abbey, Scott's View and the Wallace Monument

The village lies on the route of the Borders Abbeys Way.

See also
List of places in the Scottish Borders

External links

RCAHMS record of Clint Mains or Clintmains
CANMORE/RCAHMS record of Mertoun Mill, or Caud Stream
Historic Scotland: Mertoun House and Gardens
Scottish Borders Council: Melrose to Clintmains, Tales of walks along Borders Abbeys Way
Geograph image: Clintmains
Flickr image: Smithy at Clintmains, 1937/38

Villages in the Scottish Borders